Stephen Easley (September 4, 1952 – August 14, 2013) was an American businessman and politician.

Education and early life 
Easley was born in Indiana to Jack and Alice Easley. Easley received his bachelor's degree from Purdue University. He later earned a masters degree and then a doctorate degree in biological anthropology from Washington University. He married Susan on August 24, 1974 and they had two children.

Career 
Easley owned an informational consulting business in Santa Fe, New Mexico named Easley & Associates, an IT company. He also worked in the New Mexico state government in various positions, including as deputy chief information security officer for the state and as chief information officer for New Mexico's departments of Homeland Security, Workforce Training and Development and Public Safety.

From 2000 to 2003, Easley served as city commissioner in Alamogordo, New Mexico. In 2012, he defeated Republican Charles Miller and was elected to the New Mexico House of Representatives to represent district 50. He was serving his first term in 2013 at the time of his death from an infection.

Notes

1952 births
2013 deaths
Politicians from Santa Fe, New Mexico
Purdue University alumni
Washington University in St. Louis alumni
Businesspeople from New Mexico
Democratic Party members of the New Mexico House of Representatives